Peter Edward Carter (8 July 1938 – 11 October 2011) was a British trade unionist.

History 
Born in Tipton, Carter left school at fifteen and worked as a bricklayer while still illiterate.  Graham Stevenson claims that Carter was briefly involved with fascist street gangs, possibly the Union Movement, but he met Norma Harris in 1958, marrying her in 1962, and she influenced him to join the Young Communist League.

Carter was the organiser of the Young Communists from 1963 until 1969, in which role he was responsible for its "The Trend is Communism" campaign. and was increasingly prominent in the Communist Party of Great Britain (CPGB).  He opposed the Soviet invasion of Czechoslovakia in 1968, but this did not halt his rise in the party, and he stood in the 1970 general election against Enoch Powell in Wolverhampton South West.

During the 1970s, Carter was a leading activist in the Union of Construction, Allied Trades and Technicians (UCATT).  In Birmingham, he led a successful campaign to abolish casual labour on Bryant Estates sites, and to improve wages, drawing attention by occupying The Rotunda.  He also led the campaign against the demolition of the post office on Victoria Square, Birmingham.  From 1980, he was UCATT's organiser for the Midlands, in which post he co-ordinated the People's March for Jobs.

In 1982, the CPGB appointed Carter as its National Industrial Organiser, but conflict between him and Arthur Scargill meant work was difficult during the UK miners' strike.  He remained in post until the party dissolved in 1991, then returned to building work.

In later life, Carter lived on a canal boat and was involved in environmental campaigns.

References 

1938 births
2011 deaths
British trade unionists
Communist Party of Great Britain members
People from Tipton